Calgary Rugby Foot-ball Club was one of the first football teams based in Calgary, Alberta, formed March 14, 1906 at Calgary City Hall. It was part of the Calgary Rugby Football Union. Calgary City Rugby Foot-ball Club played its first game on October 31, 1907, defeating the Strathcona Rugby Foot-ball Club 15–0 at Calgary.

The Calgary Stampeders of the Canadian Football League, founded in 1945, do not trace their lineage to this club.

Calgary RFC was renamed the Calgary Tigers in 1908 and joined the Alberta Rugby Football League in the same year. It later joined the then newly formed Western Canada Rugby Football Union in 1911 and won the first-ever Western championship that year. The team would change names, fold and be reborn several names in next few decades:

 Calgary Tigers - 1908–14, 1919–20, 1925, 1928–30
 50th Battalion - 1923-24
 Calgary Altomah-Tigers - 1931
 Calgary Altomah-Indians - 1932-34

These teams were succeeded by a separate club:

 Calgary Bronks - 1935-40

Seasons

Other Calgary football clubs

References

 Football Canada

Defunct Canadian football teams
Rugby clubs established in 1906
Canadian football teams in Calgary
1906 establishments in Alberta
1930s disestablishments in Alberta
Sports clubs disestablished in 1934